Victor Assis Brasil (August 28, 1945 – April 14, 1981) was a Brazilian jazz saxophonist. He began playing the saxophone at the age of 16 and recorded his first album, Desenhos, in 1965. He later studied at Berklee College of Music. He also toured on three continents.

References

External links
Assis Brasil site

Brazilian jazz musicians
Berklee College of Music alumni
1945 births
1981 deaths
Brazilian saxophonists
Male saxophonists
20th-century saxophonists
20th-century male musicians
Male jazz musicians